Borrel is a surname. Notable people with the surname include:

Amédée Borrel (1867–1936), French biologist who was born in Cazouls-lès-Béziers
Andrée Borrel (1919–1944), French heroine of World War II
Cleopatra Borrel (born 1979), female shotputter from Trinidad and Tobago
José Borrel Tudurí
Josep Borrell (born 1947), Spanish and EU politician
Wilfred II Borrel, count of Barcelona, Girona, and Ausona from 897 to 911

See also
Borel (disambiguation)
Borrell (disambiguation)